The 2008 Asian Men's Handball Championship was the 13th Asian Championship, which was taking place from 17 to 26 February 2008 in Isfahan, Iran. The championship was held in Isfahan's Pirouzi Arena and acted as the Asian qualifying tournament for the 2009 World Men's Handball Championship in Croatia.

Draw

Preliminary round
All times are local (UTC+3:30).

Group A

Group B

Placement 5th–10th

9th/10th

7th/8th

5th/6th

* Bahrain didn't not show up and was penalized to the last place.

Final round

Semifinals

Bronze medal match

Gold medal match

Final standing

All-star team
Goalkeeper: 
Left wing: 
Left back: 
Pivot: 
Centre back: 
Right back: 
Right wing:

External links

Goalzz
www.asianhandball.com
Results at todor66

Asian
Handball
Handball
Asian Handball Championships
February 2008 sports events in Asia